Joe Cortez (born October 13, 1945) is an American former boxing referee who has officiated in many important world title bouts. He was inducted into the International Boxing Hall of Fame in 2011.

Biography

Cortez is of Puerto Rican descent. He had a successful amateur boxing career, winning various Golden Gloves tournaments from 1960 to 1962. In 1963, Joe turned pro at the age of eighteen. He had a record of ten wins and one defeat as a professional boxer, and the loss was to Georgie Foster from Ohio. He retired from boxing after only eleven professional fights. Cortez moved to Puerto Rico in 1969, working at The El Conquistador Hotel there; he worked his way up to Executive Assistant manager. Living there, he became fluent in Spanish. In 1977, he moved back to New York where he started work as a Casino Operations Manager for the El San Juan Hotel, one of the three properties in Puerto Rico.

Beginning in the 1977, Cortez started working as a referee. During the 1980s, he took on the responsibility to referee some major Championship fights. During this time he was the third man in the ring in several professional Mike Tyson and Roberto Durán fights.

As eminent referees Richard Steele and Mills Lane retired at the dawn of the 21st century, Cortez became one of Nevada and New York's preferred boxing referees for world title fights. He has refereed over 170 world title bouts, among which figure the first Oscar De La Hoya-Julio César Chávez meeting, Evander Holyfield and Riddick Bowe's first title fight and the match that saw 45-year-old George Foreman become the oldest World Heavyweight Champion in history. Asked by Telemundo personnel to give a prediction about the first de la Hoya-Chávez meeting prior to the fight taking place, he simply answered "I can't make any predictions", as referees are not allowed to do that before a fight (doing so might indicate favouritism towards one of the combatants).

Cortez still refereed major boxing events, and his catchphrase during pre-fight instructions, "(I am) fair but firm!" (also said as "I'm fair but I'm firm!") is now a registered trademark. Cortez also gives boxing classes and has a website www.Fairbutfirm.com, which teaches someone how to become a referee and talk show host.

He appears in the film Rocky Balboa as the referee in the exhibition bout between Balboa and the fictional champion Mason "The Line" Dixon played by the professional boxer Antonio Tarver, as well as in I Spy with Eddie Murphy and in Play It To The Bone with Antonio Banderas and Woody Harrelson.

The last "Fight of the Year" that he refereed was Amir Khan vs. Marcos Maidana in 2010. He called it "one of the most outstanding, skillful and exciting" championship fights that he refereed in his career.

Cortez was inducted into the New Jersey Boxing Hall of Fame in November 1998 and into the International Boxing Hall of Fame in 2011. He retired from refereeing in September 2012 after Canelo Alvarez vs Josesito Lopez fight, and is currently a boxing analyst for ESPN Sports.

In 2017, Cortez assisted Conor McGregor with his transition to boxing for his super fight with Floyd Mayweather Jr. Cortez was acting as the referee during Conor's sparring sessions while training for the bout.

In 2020, at the age of 75, Cortez was hospitalized after contracting COVID-19 and pneumonia but said "...I assure my people in Puerto Rico that I will return.”

Professional boxing record

See also

Spanish Golden Gloves
Sports in Puerto Rico

References

External links

Fair But Firm.com 
Boxing In Your Face with Joe Cortez
ringsidereport.com interview with Cortez

 

1945 births
American boxing referees
Living people
International Boxing Hall of Fame inductees
Puerto Rican male boxers
Puerto Rican referees and umpires
Featherweight boxers